Count Ernst Adalbert von Harrach (4 November 1598 – 25 October 1667) was an Austrian Catholic Cardinal who was appointed Archbishop of Prague and Prince-Bishop of Trento. His name in Czech is Arnošt Vojtěch hrabě z Harrachu.

Early life
Adalbert von Harrach was  born 4 November 1598 in Vienna, Austria, the son of Count Karl von Harrach and Maria Elisabeth von Schrattenbach. He was educated by Nikolaus Walther and was later, thanks to his family's connection to Italian aristocratic families including the Borghese and Barberini, admitted to the Collegio Teutonico in 1616. In 1621 he was ordained a priest at age 22. He became Archbishop of Prague in 1623.

As primate to the Kingdom of Bohemia
Adalbert von Harrach was arrested at his palace when the Swedish took over a section of Prague in the precursor conflict to the Battle of Prague and lost a significant part of his wealth. He was eventually released after intercession by  cardinal Jules Mazarin before Queen Christina of Sweden, with 15,000 écus and a letter written by him promising not to take revenge for Adalbert von Harrach's losses. 

He visited Rome rarely; so much so that when he did in 1643, Pope Urban VIII is said to have considered it a bad omen (as the cardinal would only otherwise have visited had the pope died, requiring a papal conclave).

References

1598 births
1667 deaths
17th-century Austrian cardinals
cardinals created by Pope Urban VIII
Roman Catholic archbishops of Prague
Prince-Bishops of Trent